María Soledad Alvear Valenzuela (born September 17, 1950), is a Chilean lawyer and Christian Democrat politician, who was a cabinet member of the Aylwin, Frei and Lagos administrations. She was president of the Christian Democrat Party (PDC) from 2006–2008. She is currently senator for Santiago/East.

Under President Patricio Aylwin, Alvear worked as Minister of Women's Affairs, a new Ministry created to deal with discrimination against women in Chilean society. Under the Eduardo Frei Ruiz-Tagle administration she assumed as Justice Minister and helped in completely overhauling the Criminal Justice Code, which dated from Spanish Colonial times. With Ricardo Lagos she worked as campaign manager during the 2000 runoff election, and then under his government she worked as Foreign Minister, signing Free Trade Agreement with the United States, the European Community and South Korea.

On late 2004 Alvear won her party's nomination for the upcoming presidential election, and then was to face the Socialist Party candidate, Michelle Bachelet, in an open primary election, to define a sole Concertación candidate. However, low support in opinion polls and on her own party leadership led her to resign two months before the defining primary. Her decision to run for a seat in the Senate in the concurrent parliamentary election proved successful, winning a seat for the PDC in the Santiago/East constituency. In May 2006, she became the first woman elected president of the PDC, with nearly 70% of the votes.

External links

Official senatorial campaign site (In Spanish)
Alvear quits race to lead Chile (BBC News)

1950 births
Living people
People from Puente Alto
Members of the Senate of Chile
Chilean women lawyers
Christian Democratic Party (Chile) politicians
Foreign ministers of Chile
Women government ministers of Chile
Liceo Javiera Carrera alumni
Candidates for President of Chile
Female foreign ministers
20th-century Chilean women politicians
20th-century Chilean politicians
21st-century Chilean women politicians
21st-century Chilean politicians
Women members of the Senate of Chile
Chilean women diplomats
Chilean diplomats
20th-century Chilean lawyers
Female justice ministers
20th-century women lawyers
Government ministers of Chile